Rehimena variegata is a moth in the family Crambidae. It was described by Inoue in 1996. It is found in Japan (Bonin Islands).

The larvae bore into and feed on the flower buds of Hibiscus glaber and Hibiscus tiliaceus.

References

Spilomelinae
Moths described in 1996
Moths of Japan